Echus Montes is a large mountain on Mars at .  It is located in the Lunae Palus quadrangle.

References

Mountains on Mars
Lunae Palus quadrangle